Farhad Ghaemi (born 28 August 1989)  is a volleyball player from Iran, who plays as an outside spiker for the Men's National Team. He competed at the 2016 Summer Olympics in Rio de Janeiro, Brazil. His ethnicity is Iranian Turkmen. Ghaemi had his debut national match in the 2012 Summer Olympics qualification with an invitation from Julio Velasco. He is currently playing with Foolad Sirjan Iranian.

Honours

National team
World Grand Champions Cup
Bronze medal (1): 2017
Asian Championship
Gold medal (2): 2013, 2019
Asian Games
Gold medal (2): 2014, 2018
Asian U20 Championship
Gold medal (1): 2008
U19 World Championship
Gold medal (1): 2007
Asian U18 Championship
Gold medal (1): 2007

Club
Asian Championship
Gold medal (2): 2013 (Kalleh), 2016, 2017 (Sarmayeh Bank)
Iranian Super League
Champions (2): 2013 (Kalleh), 2015 (Paykan)

Individual
Best Spiker: 2009 U21 World Championship
Best Server: 2013 Asian Club Championship

References

External links

Biography of Farhad Ghaemi 
2007 Boys' Youth World Championship F

1989 births
Living people
Iranian men's volleyball players
People from Gonbad-e Qabus
Iranian Turkmen people
Asian Games gold medalists for Iran
Asian Games medalists in volleyball
Volleyball players at the 2014 Asian Games
Volleyball players at the 2018 Asian Games
Olympic volleyball players of Iran
Volleyball players at the 2016 Summer Olympics
Iranian expatriate sportspeople in Turkey
Medalists at the 2014 Asian Games
Medalists at the 2018 Asian Games

Iranian expatriate sportspeople in Qatar
21st-century Iranian people